Burundi is a producer of columbium (niobium) and tantalum ore, tin ore, and tungsten ore, and some deposits of gold which are designated for export. Burundi has resources of copper, cobalt, nickel, feldspar, phosphate rock, quartzite, and rare reserves of uranium, and vanadium. The country is also a producer of limestone, peat, sand and gravel for domestic consumption and as building materials. As of 2005, manufacturing accounted for 8% of the country's gross domestic product.

National gold production increased to 3,905 kg in 2005 from 3,229 kg in 2004 increasing dramatically from just 415 kg in 2001 because of higher gold prices. Gold reportedly accounted for more than 90% of the value of Burundi’s total mineral production in 2005. Machanga Ltd. of Uganda and more recently the Burundi Mining Corporation were responsible for mining much of the country's primary gold reserves which are concentrated in Muyinga Province in the north-east of the country.

Columbium (niobium) and tantalum were mined by Asyst Mines, Comptoirs Miniers de Burundi S.A., Hamza, and Habonimana but the production of columbite-tantalite ore decreased considerably to 23,356 kg in 2004 from 72,441 kg in 2002 because low world market prices saw a slump in the demand for tantalum oxide in 2004. In 2005, production increased to 42,592 kg and has continued to rise again and columbite-tantalite production accounted for 5% of the value of Burundi’s mineral production as of 2005.  An Australian company Argosy Minerals Incorporated was proposing to develop mines in the country but has had its Mining Convention and licences suspended by the government due to failure to meet commitments.

Small quantities of tungsten and tin but only account for 3% of Burundi's total mineral production according to the Burundi Ministry of Energy and Mines The Office National de la Tourbe a branch of the government is responsible for peat production which is extracted notably in the Akanyara Valley near Buyongwe and in 2005 unmined resources of peat were stated by the Burundian government to total around 36 million metric tons.

However Burundi has no resources of coal, natural gas, or petroleum meaning that electricity production in the country was very problematic. Hydroelectric power stations now account for most of the country’s electricity production as they do not have the natural reserves to produce it.

References

 
Economy of Burundi
Environment of Burundi
Burundi